Boddupalli Amit (born 30 March 1988) is an Indian cricketer. He made his List A debut on 27 February 2014, for Bengal in the 2013–14 Vijay Hazare Trophy. He made his first-class debut for Bengal in the 2017–18 Ranji Trophy on 6 October 2017.

References

External links
 

1988 births
Living people
Indian cricketers
Bengal cricketers
Cricketers from Kolkata